Minister for Children, the Elderly and Equality was a minister post in the Ministry of Health and Social Affairs during the Löfven Cabinet. It was held by Åsa Regnér (2014–2018) and Lena Hallengren (2018–2019).

See also
 Minister for Gender Equality (Sweden)

References

Children, the Elderly and Equality
Sweden
Childhood in Sweden